Angeliki Panagiotatou (1875 or 1878 – 1954) was a Greek physician and microbiologist.   She was the first woman physician in modern Greece to have graduated from a University in Greece (predecessor Maria Kalapothakes having qualified abroad).

Life 
Born in Greece, Panagiotatou and her sister Alexandra were the first two female students to be accepted in the medical school at Athens University in 1893, after having proved that there were not formal law banning women from attending university in Greece.  In 1897, she became he first woman to graduate from the Medical School in Athens. 

After she completed further studies in Germany, she returned to Athens University as a lecturer: she was the first woman lecturer in the Laboratory of Hygiene at the Medical School of Athens.   

The students protested and refused to attend her classes because she was a woman, so she was forced to resign. She moved to Egypt, where she became a professor in microbiology at Cairo University specializing in tropical diseases and director of the Alexandria general hospital. In 1938, she returned to Greece and was named a professor at the Athens University medical school.  She became the first Deputy Professor of Hygiene and Tropical Medicine in Greece, in 1947 an honorary Professor at the Medical School of Athens and in 1950 she became the first female member of the Academy of Athens.

References 

1870s births
1954 deaths
Greek microbiologists
20th-century women scientists
20th-century Greek physicians
Greek women physicians
Egyptian microbiologists
20th-century women physicians
19th-century Greek physicians
19th-century women physicians
National and Kapodistrian University of Athens alumni
Academic staff of the National and Kapodistrian University of Athens
People from Cephalonia